Peasant Movement Institute Station is a station of Line 1 of the Guangzhou Metro. It started operations on 28 June 1997. It is located at the underground of the junction of Zhongshan 4th Road and Dezheng Road  in Yuexiu District. Its name is from nearby the former site of Guangzhou Peasant Movement Institute, an institute established by the Chinese Communist Party to train youngsters for the peasants' revolutionary movement.

Station layout

Exits

Around the station
 Guangzhou Peasant Movement Institute

References

Railway stations in China opened in 1997
Guangzhou Metro stations in Yuexiu District